Wallace Township may refer to the following townships in the United States:

 Wallace Township, LaSalle County, Illinois
 Wallace Township, Ontario
 Wallace Township, Chester County, Pennsylvania